Labdia oxycharis is a moth in the family Cosmopterigidae. It was described by Edward Meyrick in 1921. It is mostly found on Java in Indonesia.

References

Labdia
Moths described in 1921